Puka Pampa (Quechua puka red, pampa plain, "red plain", also spelled Pucapampa) is a mountain in the northern part of the Cordillera Blanca in the Andes of Peru which reaches a height of approximately . It is located in the Ancash Region, Corongo Province, Cusca District.

Sources

Mountains of Peru
Mountains of Ancash Region